The Singer of Naples (Spanish:El cantante de Napoles) is a 1935 American musical film directed by Howard Bretherton and Moreno Cuyar and starring Enrico Caruso Jr., Mona Maris and Carmen Río. It was made in Spanish by the Hollywood studio Warner Brothers. Unlike many other American Spanish language films of the era it was not a remake of an English language film.

It was the last of Warner Brothers's Hollywood-made Spanish films. The increasing success of dubbing meant that it was less viable to make separate Spanish films, and in future it became more common for films to be made in a single English version and then dubbed into a variety of other languages for global release.

Plot
A blacksmith's son from Naples rises to become a celebrated opera singer, performing at La Scala in Milan.

Cast
Enrico Caruso Jr. as Enrico Daspurro  
Mona Maris as Teresa  
Carmen Río as Maria  
Alfonso Pedroza as Fortuni  
Antonio Vidal as Prof. Rubini  
Emilia Leovalli as Signora Daspurro 
Enrique Acosta as Signor Daspurro  
Francisco Marán as Eduardo  
Martin Garralaga as Beppo 
María Calvo as Signora Corelli  
Rosa Rey as Doña Rosa  
Chevo Pirrín as Mensajero  
Terry La Franconi as Cantante 
Felipe Osta as Carlo

References

Bibliography
Waldman, Harry. Hollywood and the Foreign Touch: A Dictionary of Foreign Filmmakers and Their Films from America, 1910-1995. Scarecrow Press, 1996.

External links

American musical films
1935 musical films
Films directed by Howard Bretherton
Films set in Naples
Films based on Mexican novels
American black-and-white films
1930s Spanish-language films
Spanish-language American films
1930s American films
Films scored by Bernhard Kaun
Warner Bros. films
Films about singers